Satan's Kingdom is an unincorporated village in the town of Northfield, Franklin County, Massachusetts, United States.

Satan's Kingdom has been noted for its unusual place name.  It was named Satan's Kingdom after a resident of Northfield walked out of a church where a sermon about the fires of hell had just been given and saw a forest fire across the Connecticut River, and observed that Satan's Kingdom was burning.

References

Villages in Franklin County, Massachusetts
Villages in Massachusetts